Ashley Marshall (born September 10, 1993) is an American sprinter who represents Barbados.

Professional
Ashley Marshall set a 60 meters Barbadian records in athletics at University of Washington Huskies invitational in February 2016. Marshall placed 27th in 2016 IAAF World Indoor Championships - Women's 60 metres running 7.38.

UC Davis
Marshall earned three track athlete of the year awards (2013, 2014, 2015) awarded by Big West Conference.

Prep
A 2011 alum of Rancho Verde High School. As a senior, Marshall placed 3rd in California Interscholastic Federation state final with a wind-hindered 11.91 in 100 meters. Marshall won 2011 Southern Section title with wind-aided 11.7. In 2010, her 4x100 team earned silver at USATF Junior Olympics.

References

External links
 

1993 births
Living people
Sportspeople from Riverside County, California
Barbadian sportswomen
University of California, Davis alumni
Barbadian female sprinters
UC Davis Aggies
Track and field athletes from Los Angeles
American female sprinters
African-American female track and field athletes
21st-century African-American sportspeople
21st-century African-American women